The Abbot and then Commendator of Culross was the head of the monastic community of Culross Abbey, Fife, Scotland. The abbey was founded in 1218 on the patronage of Maol Choluim I, Earl of Fife by Cistercian monks from Kinloss Abbey, Moray. Control of the abbey was secularized in the 16th century and after the accession of James Stewart, the abbey was held by commendators. The number of monks under the abbot had also declined by the 16th century, there being only 15 monks by 1557.

List of Abbots
Hugh (I), 1217-1227
William de Ramsay, 1230-1232
Hugh (II), 1232-1245
Matthew, 1245-1246
Geoffrey, 1246-1252
Michael, 1252-1260
John de Haddington, 1260
Gilbert, c. 1296
???, d. 1329 x 1331
Adam de Strivelyn (or Scrawelyn), x 1337-1340
Walter, 1340x1354
Adam de Crail,  c. 1399
John de Peebles, c. 1399-1435
Robert de Wedale, 1435-1444
Laurence de Lindores, 1436-1443 x 1444
Richard Marshall, 1449-1467 x 1469
James Rait, 1468 x 1469-1489 x 1490 
Laurence Button, x 1486
Andrew Mason, c1486
John Hog, 1490-1492
Andrew Forman, 1492-1493
Thomas, 1492-1493 
Andrew Mason (again), 1493-1510 
Philip of Luxembourg, c. 1510
James Stewart, 1511-1513

List of Commendators

Thomas Nudry, 1514-1527
Peter de Accoltis, 1529
James Inglis, 1529-1531
Sixtus Zuchellus, 1531
William Colville, 1531-1567
John Colville (I), 1535-1550 x 1552
William Colville (again), 1550 x 1552-1567
Francis Stewart, 1567
Alexander Colville, 1567-1581/7
John Colville (II), 1581–1587, 
Alexander Colville (again), 1587-1597
John Colville (again), 1597-1609

Current ministry

The remaining intact part of Culross Abbey is still used by the Church of Scotland as the local parish church. The current minister of Culross Abbey (since 2009) is the Reverend Jayne Scott.

Notes

Bibliography
 Cowan, Ian B. & Easson, David E., Medieval Religious Houses: Scotland With an Appendix on the Houses in the Man, Second Edition, (London, 1976), p. 74
 Watt, D.E.R. & Shead, N.F. (eds.), The Heads of Religious Houses in Scotland from the 12th to the 16th Centuries (The Scottish Records Society, New Series, Volume 24), (Edinburgh, 2001), pp. 50–4

Cistercian abbots by monastery
Scottish abbots
Abbot